Jack Klaff is a South African-born actor, writer and academic. He has held professorships at Princeton University and Starlab.

Amongst his early screen roles were in Star Wars Episode IV: A New Hope (1977) as Red Four and For Your Eyes Only (1981) as Apostis. He also appeared in the 1984-87 BBC radio comedy series Delve Special alongside Stephen Fry.

Filmography

References

External links
 

20th-century South African male actors
21st-century South African male actors
Living people
South African male film actors
South African male television actors
Place of birth missing (living people)
1951 births